The 2019–20 season is Bayern Munich's 73rd season in existence and the club's the 9th consecutive season in the Basketball Bundesliga and the 2nd consecutive season in the EuroLeague. It is the third consecutive season under head coach Dejan Radonjić, who signed in April 2018.

Times up to 26 October 2019 and from 29 March 2020 are CEST (UTC+2). Times from 27 October 2019 to 28 March 2020 are CET (UTC+1).

Players

Squad information

Transactions

In

|}

Out

|}

Pre-season and friendlies

Competitions

Overview

Basketball Bundesliga

League table

Results summary

Results by round

Matches

EuroLeague

League table

Results summary

Results by round

Matches

BBL-Pokal

Round of 16

References

External links
 Official website

Bayern
Bayern